Tischler is a German-language occupational surname. It means cabinetmaker or joiner in German and Yiddish and is found among both Germans and Ashkenazi Jews. A variant is Tishler.

Notable people with this surname include:

Bluma Tischler, physician
Bob Tischler, television producer
Emil Tischler, Czech footballer
Friedrich Tischler, ornithologist
Georg Tischler, athlete
Hans Tischler (1915 - 2010), American musicologist and composer
Heike Tischler, athlete
Joyce Tischler, co-founder of the Animal Legal Defense Fund
Matthias M. Tischler, historian
Nik Tischler, bassist with You Am I
Patrick Tischler, athlete
Patrik Tischler, athlete
Randy Tischler, hacker better known as "Taran King"
Stanford Tischler (1921-2014), American filmmaker

German-language surnames
Occupational surnames